NSW Public Works (or New South Wales Public Works), an agency of the Government of New South Wales, was responsible for providing expert advice to government and professional services to government agency clients in New South Wales, Australia.

The agency managed a range of large and small projects and facilities contracts with an annual value of more than 1 billion. It merged with Property NSW to form a new Property and Advisory Group of the New South Wales Public Works Advisory in July 2016.

The agency was led by Deputy Director-General, presently Brian Baker, who reported to the Director General of the Department of Finance, Services and Innovation, most recently Martin Hoffman, who reported to the Minister for Finance, Services and Property, most recently Victor Dominello MP.

References

External links
NSW Public Works Advisory website

Public Works Advisory